Maurice William Broomfield (2 February 1916 – 4 October 2010) was an English photographer whose images of post-war British industry were credited with capturing the optimistic spirit of the time.

Life and work
Born in Draycott, Derbyshire, England, Broomfield was the son of a lace designer. On leaving school at 15, he worked as a lathe operator on the assembly lines of the engineering company Rolls-Royce. In the evenings he studied at Derby College of Art. During the Second World War he was a conscientious objector, working in the Friends Ambulance Unit as an ambulance driver in the London Blitz, and after the war for Save the Children in Germany. Broomfield's archive has been acquired by the Victoria and Albert Museum.

The British Library conducted an oral history interview (C459/194) with Maurice Broomfield in 2007 for its An Oral History of British Photography collection.

Personal life
Broomfield married twice, firstly to Anita Sonja Lagusova, in 1947, with whom he had two children, Ann, and documentary film-maker Nick. Lagusova died in 
1982, aged 60, from cancer. In 1987, he married Suzy Thompson-Coon.

References

External links
 Personal website, including slideshow of images
 Obituary in The Independent by Marcus Williamson

1916 births
2010 deaths
Photographers from Derbyshire
English photojournalists
English conscientious objectors
People associated with the Friends' Ambulance Unit
Industrial photographers
People from the Borough of Erewash